Andreas Vojta (born 9 June 1989 in Vienna) is an Austrian distance runner. He competed in the 1500 metres competition at the 2012 Summer Olympics.

Running career
Andreas Vojta began his running career at LCC Vienna. He was initially trained by Renata Sitek and then rose to the training group of athletic conductor Wilhelm Lilge. After finishing a strong 11th overall in the men's 1500 metres at the 2010 European Athletics Championships, he was named Austrian athlete of the year and was awarded the "Golden Emil".

Competition record

See also
Austria at the 2012 Summer Olympics

References

External links

1989 births
Living people
Austrian male middle-distance runners
Olympic athletes of Austria
Athletes (track and field) at the 2012 Summer Olympics
World Athletics Championships athletes for Austria
European Games competitors for Austria
European Games gold medalists for Austria
Athletes (track and field) at the 2015 European Games
European Games medalists in athletics
Universiade medalists in athletics (track and field)
Universiade bronze medalists for Austria
Competitors at the 2015 Summer Universiade
Medalists at the 2013 Summer Universiade
Medalists at the 2017 Summer Universiade
Athletes from Vienna
21st-century Austrian people